Cosmopterix lautissimella is a moth in the family Cosmopterigidae. It was described by Hans Georg Amsel in 1968. It is found in Pakistan.

References

Arctiidae genus list at Butterflies and Moths of the World of the Natural History Museum

Moths described in 1968
lautissimella